These hits topped the Dutch Top 40 in 1960.

See also
1960 in music

References

1960 in the Netherlands
1960 record charts
1960